Silangan Industrial Park, also known as Canlubang Industrial Estate, is an industrial zone located at barangay Canlubang, Calamba, Laguna. It is situated at Silangan Industrial Avenue and Jose Yulo Avenue.

Silangan Industrial has numerous plants, factories and subdivisions. It is bounded of LISP-1 and  CPIP-1.

Canlubang Airstrip
The Silangan Airstrip Industrial Estate, Calamba 4013, Laguna or also known as Calamba Airfield is the former airstrip use by the military since 1940s, when the sugar estate was established under Jose Yulo. Nowadays, the airstrip is defunct, due to the proposal of industrial parks, factories, plants and subdivisions. It is bounded of LISP and CPIP-1. It is the second largest science park in Laguna province, succeeded by Light Industrial Science Park in Terelay, Cabuyao its closely beside bounded by San Cristobal River.

Locators

References

Canlubang
Industrial parks in the Philippines
Buildings and structures in Calamba, Laguna